The 2016 Berlin Marathon was the 43rd edition of the Berlin Marathon. The marathon took place in Berlin, Germany, on 25 September 2016 and was the fourth World Marathon Majors race of the year. The men's race was won by Kenenisa Bekele in 2 hours, 3 minutes and 3 seconds, the second fastest time ever. Wilson Kipsang was only 10 seconds behind him.

Results

Men

Women

References

External links
Berlin Marathon

2016 in Berlin
Berlin Marathon
Berlin Marathon
Berlin Marathon
September 2016 sports events in Germany